Opossum Bay is a rural residential locality in the local government area of Clarence in the Hobart region of Tasmania. The 2016 census has a population of 329 for the state suburb of Opossum Bay.

It is located on the South Arm Peninsula on the outskirts of Hobart.

History
Opossum Bay was gazetted as a locality in 1967.

Opossum Bay Post Office opened on 16 January 1942 and closed in 1980.

The origin of Opossum Bay's name is unclear.

In 1997, Opossum Bay received national attention when it was the location of where Labor Senator Nick Sherry had an overnight stay with his mother and was accused of misusing his travel allowances for this stay.
The controversy that ensued led to Sherry attempting suicide, which he survived.

Geography
The Derwent River forms the western and northern boundaries, and Ralphs Bay the eastern.

Opossum Bay is nearly surrounded by water. The Gellibrand Point, Opossum Bay and South Arm Town area is connected to the rest of the South Arm Peninsula by a narrow isthmus. The proximity to the Derwent River and Ralphs Bay can result in Opossum Bay frequently being cooled by sea breezes in summer.

Road infrastructure
The B33 route (South Arm Road) enters from the south-east and runs north to the town, where it ends.

Notable residents
 Brian Ritchie – bass guitarist for the band Violent Femmes.

References

Towns in Tasmania
Bays of Tasmania
Beaches of Tasmania
South Arm Peninsula
Localities of City of Clarence